Lin-9 homolog is a protein that is encoded by the LIN9 gene in humans.

Interactions 

LIN9 has been shown to interact with the retinoblastoma protein.

References

Further reading